Nagareddipet is a village in the Kamareddy/Medak border. Medak Town is around 21 km from Nagareddipet. Nagareddipet is a Mandal in the area, with villages like Tandoor, Jalalpur, Venkampally, Chinnoor, Malthumedha, Lingampally, and Atmakur under it.

People and customs 
Even though Geographically, Nagareddipet belongs to the Kamareddy District, its customs are more aligned to Medak's, due to its proximity to there.

Prominent People

V. Venkatram Reddy: Nagireddipet is the home of veteran Congress two-time Assembly leader Mr. Vittalreddygari Venkatram Reddy. Mr V. Venkatram Reddy was elected two times consecutively to the first two terms of the Andhra Pradesh assembly. Mr V. Venkatram Reddy has two sons, Mr. V. Jagapathi Reddy and Mr. V. Sanjeeva Reddy. Mr. V. Venkatram Reddy is still leading a simple life in the Village doing a bit of Farming and living on the pension amount that he gets from the AP Govt. He was known for his generosity and kindness during his tenure. He has sold his own property, leave alone earning money when in power, to help people.

Kamareddy district